Antipin is a Russian masculine surname, its feminine counterpart is Antipina. It may refer to
Stanislav Antipin (born 1995), Russian football player
Viktor Antipin (born 1992), Kazakh ice-hockey player, son of Vladimir
Vladimir Antipin (born 1970), Kazakh ice-hockey player